Hypergonadotropic hypergonadism is an endocrine situation and subtype of hypergonadism in which both gonadotropin levels and gonadal function, such as sex hormone production, are abnormally high. It can be associated with hyperandrogenism and hyperestrogenism and with gonadal cysts and tumors. It can be caused by medications such as gonadotropins, gonadotropin-releasing hormone agonists, nonsteroidal antiandrogens, and selective estrogen receptor modulators, as well as conditions like human chorionic gonadotropin-secreting tumors, complete androgen insensitivity syndrome, and estrogen insensitivity syndrome.

See also
 Hypergonadotropic hypogonadism
 Hypogonadotropic hypogonadism

References

Animal reproductive system
Endocrine gonad disorders
Gynaecologic disorders
Male genital disorders
Menstrual disorders
Intersex variations